A taquito (Spanish for "small taco"), tacos dorados, rolled taco, or flauta (Spanish for "flute") is a Mexican food dish that typically consists of a small rolled-up tortilla that contains  filling, including beef, cheese or chicken. The filled tortilla is then crisp-fried or deep-fried. The dish is often topped with condiments such as sour cream and guacamole. Corn tortillas are generally used to make taquitos. The dish is more commonly known as flautas when they are larger than their taquito counterparts, and can be made with either flour or corn tortillas.

History
The taquito or small taco was referred to in the 1917 Preliminary Glossary of New Mexico Spanish, with the word noted as a "Mexicanism" used in New Mexico. The modern definition of a taquito as a rolled-tortilla dish was given in 1929 in a book of stories of Mexican people in the United States aimed at a youth audience, where the dish was noted as a particularly popular offering of railroad station vendors. Taquitos were referred to, without definition, in a 1932 issue of the Los Angeles School Journal.

Two Southern California restaurants are often given credit for their roles in the early development of the taquito. Cielito Lindo was founded by Aurora Guerrero in 1934 and located on Olvera Street in Los Angeles. Guerrero's daughter used her taquito recipe in opening chain restaurants in Los Angeles, and soon competitors were selling similar dishes. In San Diego, what would become El Indio Mexican Restaurant, began selling taquitos during World War II, when tortilla factory owner Ralph Pesqueria Sr. was asked by workers at the Consolidated Aircraft Company factory across the street for a portable lunch item. Pesqueria, who used a recipe developed by his Mexican grandmother, has claimed credit for introducing the word "taquito" for the dish.

Taquitos were among the early Mexican food items developed as a frozen food, with Van de Kamp introducing a successful frozen taquito offering by 1976. The United States government has determined that taquitos must contain at least 15% meat.

Crispy fried taquitos sold in Mexico are often called tacos dorados ("golden tacos") or flautas. Typical toppings and sides include cabbage, crema (Mexican sour cream), guacamole, green chili or red chili salsa and crumbled Mexican cheese such as queso fresco.

"Taquitos" in the Mexican border cities of Tijuana and Mexicali refer to small tacos sold in stands, rather than the rolled taco dish.

See also 

 Burrito
 List of Mexican dishes
 List of stuffed dishes
 List of tortilla-based dishes
 Lumpiang Shanghai
 Taco

References

External links 

 

Fast food
Mexican cuisine
Street food
Stuffed dishes
Taco
Tex-Mex cuisine
Tortilla-based dishes